Zawadówka  is a village in the administrative district of Gmina Rejowiec, within Chełm County, Lublin Voivodeship, in eastern Poland.

Geography 

References

Villages in Chełm County